The Alipashiad or Alipashias is a Greek epic poem, written in the early 19th century by the Muslim Albanian Haxhi Shehreti. The work is inspired by and named after Ali Pasha, the Ottoman lord of Ioannina, Epirus, describing, in heroic style, his life and military campaigns.

Background and historical value

Although Ali Pasha was Albanian, he used Greek in his courtly dealings, since this was the dominant language in the regions he controlled. Moreover, the use of Greek language in various works of Albanian authors was very common. In accordance to this, the composer of the Alipashiad, who was Ali's personal balladeer, Haxhi Shehreti, composed this work in Greek language, considering it a more prestigious language in which to praise his master. William Leake says that Shehreti had no Greek education and knew only the colloquial Greek of Albania and its borders. The language of the poem, therefore (according to Leake) represents the local vulgar dialect of the Greek language.

Historically, the Alipashiad contains the unusual feature of being written from the Muslim point of view. Apart from describing Ali's adventures the poem describes Ioannina, which was a center of Greek culture and renaissance that time, as well as the activities of the local mercenaries (Armatoles) and revolutionaries (Klephts) that Ali had to deal with.

Text and date
The Alipashiad consists of 15,000 lines and was written in installments in the first years of the 19th century, when Ali Pasha was at his height as the powerful and semi-independent ruler of much of Ottoman Greece. The poem is written in a modern demotic Greek language and contains some dialectical interference and foreign expressions. A copy of the poem was found by the British antiquarian and topographer, William Martin Leake, in 1817. In 1835 he published 4,500 lines of the Alipashiad. The entire poem was published by the Greek historian Constantine Sathas in his volume Historical Disquisitions in 1870 (The Alipashiad, of the Turco-albanian Hadji Sehreti).

References

External links
Leake William Martin. Travels in northern Greece. J. Rodwell, 1835.
 Κ. Ν. Σάθα. Ιστορικαί διατριβαί H Αληπασιάς, του Τουρκαλβανού Χατζή Σεχρέτη. (The Alipashiad, of the Turkalbanian Hadji Sehreti) in "Ιστορικαί Διατριβαί" (Historical Disquisitions), Athens, 1870, pp. 123–336 (original text of the Alipashiad with comments and bibliography on Ali Pasha, in Greek).
Irakli Koçollari The Alipashiad of Haxhi Shehreti Onufri, 1997 (Albanian)

Ali Pasha of Ioannina
Epic poems in Greek
19th-century poems
1870 books
Modern Greek literature